Gutknecht is a surname of German origin. Notable people with the surname include:

 Adolf Gutknecht, German First World War flying ace
 Christoph Gutknecht, former German professor of English studies
 Gil Gutknecht, American politician
 Jürg Gutknecht, Swiss computer scientist

See also
Edwin and Jennie Gutknecht House